The Minister for the South and Cohesion Policies (Italian: Ministro per il Sud e le Politiche di Coesione) in Italy is one of the positions in the Italian government. The current minister is Raffaele Fitto, of Brothers of Italy, who is serving since 22 October 2022.
 
From 1964 to 1987 and, again, from 1988 to 1993 Italian governments included a "minister for the Extraordinary Interventions in the Mezzogiorno" (1964–1966, 1972–1987, 1988–1993) or a "minister for the Extraordinary Interventions in the Mezzogiorno and the depressed areas" (1966–1972). Mezzogiorno is an alternative name for Southern Italy. The office was notably held by Paolo Emilio Taviani (1968–1972, 1972–1973), Giulio Andreotti (1974–1976) and Ciriaco De Mita (1976–1979).

List of Ministers
 Parties

 Coalitions

References

Territorial Cohesion
it:Ministri per il Sud e la coesione territoriale della Repubblica Italiana